The Texas Chili Cook-off (formerly "Lone Star Chili Cook-off") is an annual  chili cook-off held during May in New York City. The event is organized and run by the 'New York Texas Exes', local alumni chapter of the University of Texas at Austin. Proceeds from the Cook-off benefit the chapter's scholarship endowment.

History 
The first Texas Chili Cook-off was held in 1994. Attendance at the event was under 100 and only 8 chili teams competed. Today, the event draws upwards of 1,500 in attendance, has 36 teams competing and has a panel of 9 judges with professional experience in the food industry. The 2013 Cook-off is widely regarded as the most competitive to date.

There was no 2020 cook-off because of the COVID-19 pandemic.

Teams 
Teams consist of up to five members and are required to provide 5 gallons of chili to serve at the event. Prizes are awarded to the top three teams as well as a "People's Choice" winner. The prizes all consist of Shiner Bock beer, which is otherwise unavailable in New York City. Prizes are as follows:
 1st Place - 2 cases of Shiner Bock 
 2nd Place - 1 case of Shiner Bock 
 3rd Place - ½ case of Shiner Bock (12 pack)
 Best Presentation - ½ case of Shiner Bock (12 pack)  - new for 2011
 Best Restaurant Chili - ½ case of Shiner Bock (12 pack) - new for 2011
 People's Choice - ½ case of Shiner Bock (12 pack)

Judging 
The panel is made up of nine judges who all have professional experience in the food industry. The teams are divided into three groups of nine. Three judges judge each group. From each group, the top three teams advance to the final, where all nine judges will judge each chili. Judging is scored in the following categories:
Color 
Heat 
Texture 
Flavor/Taste

Results 
2013
 First Place - Red Hot Chili Peppers
2012
 First Place - Austin Chili Limits
 Second Place - Come and Take It Chili Co
 Third Place -  Dog's Mustache Chili Co.
 People's Choice - Soy Caliente
 Team Presentation - Chili con Blarney
2011
 First Place - WildER Turkeys
 Second Place - T Love and Special Sauce
 Third Place - Dog's Mustache Chili Co.
 People's Choice - WildER Turkeys
 Team Presentation - T Love and Special Sauce
2010 
 First Place - Whaley Hot
 Second Place - More Cowbell
 Third Place (tie) - Austin Chili Limits/Big Tex & the Southern Sweethearts
 People's Choice - WildER Turkey's

References

External links 
 Official Website of the Lone Star Chili Cook-off
 Official Website of the New York Texas Exes
 Official website of the Texas A&M Club of New York

Food and drink festivals in the United States
Cooking competitions in the United States
Festivals in New York City
Chili con carne festivals